Pragpur was one of the 68 constituencies in the Himachal Pradesh Legislative Assembly of Himachal Pradesh a northern state of India. It was in Kangra district and was a part of Kangra Lok Sabha constituency.

Members of the Legislative Assembly

References

Former assembly constituencies of Himachal Pradesh
Kangra district
2008 disestablishments in India